= Ambaye =

Village in Maharashtra

- Village
- Interactive map of Ambaye
- Coordinates: 17.8080374°N 73.3705143°E
- Country: India
- State: Maharashtra

Ambaye is a small village in Ratnagiri district, Maharashtra state in Western India. The 2011 Census of India recorded a total of 1,686 residents in the village. Ambaye's geographical area is approximately 1,125 hectares (2,780 acres).

The main deity in this village is Shri Bhairi Koteshwari Manai Zolai Kalkai.
